Katakalon Kekaumenos was a prominent Byzantine general of the mid-11th century.

Biography

Katakalon Kekaumenos was born in Koloneia, and although apparently a member of the noble Katakalon family, according to John Skylitzes he was not of aristocratic origin. He first distinguished himself in the Sicilian campaign of George Maniakes. There, Kekaumenos, with the rank of protospatharios, commanded a contingent from the Armeniac Theme and led the successful defence of Messina against an Arab attack in 1040.

In 1042, Emperor Michael V (r. 1041–1042) charged him with quelling an uprising in Constantinople. In the next year, he defeated the Rus' raid against the imperial capital, and was named vestes and archon of the Danubian cities. Under Emperor Constantine IX Monomachos (r. 1042–1055) he had a highly successful career. He served in the East as doux of Iberia, and became governor of Ani after it was annexed by the Byzantine Empire in 1045, and led the local forces in the first clashes with the Seljuk Turks. In the late 1040s, he had been promoted to the post of stratelates of the East, and participated in the campaign against the Pechenegs, as second-in-command to the militarily inexperienced rhaiktor Nikephoros. During this campaign, he was seriously injured. In circa 1055, he was raised to magistros and appointed to the prestigious and powerful post of doux of Antioch.

Emperor Constantine IX's successor, Michael VI (r. 1056–1057), generally mistrusted the prominent generals and treated them badly; he refused Katakalon and Isaac Komnenos, both of them already ranked as magistroi, promotion to the title of proedros, and eventually dismissed Kekaumenos. In turn, Kekaumenos actively supported the uprising of Isaac Komnenos in 1057, and was rewarded with the title of kouropalates.

Portrayal in the sources and literary activity
Kekaumenos apparently wrote an autobiography, which was then used as his primary source for the events of 1042–1057 by John Skylitzes in his own history. Hence, Skylitzes's narrative describes his career in great detail and is highly laudatory of the general and his achievements. Katakalon Kekaumenos has also been put forward as the author of the so-called Strategikon of Kekaumenos, but his identification with its author, known only as Kekaumenos, is rejected by most modern scholars.

References

Sources
 
 
 

11th-century deaths
11th-century Byzantine military personnel
Byzantine generals
Byzantine governors
Byzantine people of the Arab–Byzantine wars
Byzantine people of the Byzantine–Seljuk wars
Year of birth unknown
Katakalon family
Magistroi
Byzantine governors of Antioch
Protospatharioi